Secuieni is a commune in Neamț County, Western Moldavia, Romania. It is composed of nine villages: Bașta, Bârjoveni, Bogzești, Butnărești, Giulești, Prăjești, Secuieni, Secuienii Noi and Uncești.

References

Communes in Neamț County
Localities in Western Moldavia